Thomas Verdell (May 8, 1905 – January 4, 1987) was an American college football player and coach. He served as the head football coach at Howard University in Washington, D.C. from 1929 to 1933, compiling a record of 13–24–3.

Verdell was born in Alabama and grew up in Chicago. He attended Northwestern University, where he played football as an end from 1926 to 1928. Following his graduating in 1929, he was appointed head coach in football and track at Howard. After five years at Howard, Verdell moved on to Virginia State University in 1934 to work as assistant football coach under Harry R. Jefferson and later assisted Sylvester Hall. Verdell spent 39 years at Virginia State, during which time was also head coach in boxing, track, and wrestling and an associate professor of health, physical education, and recreation. In 1963, he was appointed as Virginia State's acting athletic director.

Head coaching record

Football

References

External links
 

1905 births
1987 deaths
American football ends
Howard Bison football coaches
Northwestern Wildcats football players
Virginia State Trojans athletic directors
Virginia State Trojans football coaches
College boxing coaches in the United States
College track and field coaches in the United States
College wrestling coaches in the United States
Virginia State University faculty
Sportspeople from Chicago
Coaches of American football from Illinois
Players of American football from Chicago
African-American coaches of American football
African-American players of American football
African-American college athletic directors in the United States
20th-century African-American sportspeople